Gorno Konjari is a village in the municipality of Petrovec, North Macedonia.

Demographics
As of the 2021 census, Gorno Konjari had 244 residents with the following ethnic composition:
Macedonians 229
Persons for whom data are taken from administrative sources 11
Serbs 3
Others 1

According to the 2002 census, the village had a total of 237 inhabitants. Ethnic groups in the village include:
Macedonians 236
Serbs 1

References

External links

Villages in Petrovec Municipality